is a Japanese manga series written and illustrated by Jun Mayuzuki. It has been serialized in Shueisha's Weekly Young Jump since November 2019. The story is set in Kowloon Walled City, Hong Kong.

Plot

Production
According to Mayuzuki, she had the idea of launching a series about Kowloon Walled City even when her previous work After the Rain was still being serialized. She liked the topic of Kowloon Walled City and first learned about it from Kowloon's Gate when she was young.

Publication
Kowloon Generic Romance is written and illustrated by Jun Mayuzuki. The series began in Shueisha's Weekly Young Jump on November 7, 2019. Shueisha has collected its chapters into individual tankōbon volumes. The first volume was published on February 19, 2020. As of November 19, 2022, eight volumes have been published.

In January 2022, Yen Press announced that they had licensed the manga for English release in North America, and the first volume was released in July of the same year. The series is also licensed in France by Kana.

Volume list

Reception
In 2020, the manga was one of the 50 nominees for the 6th Next Manga Awards. Kowloon Generic Romance ranked 3rd on Takarajimasha's Kono Manga ga Sugoi! list of best manga of 2021 for male readers. Kowloon Generic Romance was nominated for the 14th Manga Taishō in 2021 and placed 9th with 46 points.

References

External links
 

Comics set in Hong Kong
Romance anime and manga
Science fiction anime and manga
Seinen manga
Shueisha manga
Slice of life anime and manga
Yen Press titles